Montezuma Fuller (1858–1925) was an American architect.  He was the "most notable architect in the late nineteenth and early twentieth centuries" of Fort Collins, Colorado.

He was born November 13, 1858, in Nova Scotia.  In 1880 he came to Fort Collins, Colorado and worked for local contractors.  He became known as a "'carpenter and builder'" and eventually "developed a reputation as an 'architect' although he still had no formal training in that field."

A number of his works are listed on the U.S. National Register of Historic Places (NRHP).

Works include:
Peter Anderson House, 300 S. Howes St. Fort Collins, Colorado, NRHP-listed
First United Presbyterian Church, built 1906, 400 E. 4th St. Loveland, Colorado, NRHP-listed
Montezuma Fuller House, 226 W. Magnolia St. Fort Collins, Colorado, NRHP-listed
Kissock Block Building, 115–121 E. Mountain Ave. Fort Collins, Colorado, NRHP-listed
Six or more works in Laurel School Historic District, including Laurel School, district is located off U.S. 287 Fort Collins, Colorado, NRHP-listed
McHugh–Andrews House, 202 Remington St. Fort Collins, Colorado, NRHP-listed
Mosman House, 324 E. Oak St. Fort Collins, Colorado, NRHP-listed

A biography, Montezuma W. Fuller: A history of his life and architectural practice, by Elizabeth A Bacon, is out of print.

References

19th-century American architects
Architects from Colorado
British emigrants to the United States
People from Fort Collins, Colorado
1858 births
1925 deaths
20th-century American architects